Samaná El Catey International Airport  , also called Aeropuerto Internacional Presidente Juan Bosch (AISA), is an international airport that opened on 6 November 2006, serving the province of Samaná in the Dominican Republic.

Local travel times are given as 30 minutes drive to Las Terrenas, 40 minutes drive to the provincial capital, Santa Barbara de Samaná, and approximately one hour drive to Las Galeras.

Facilities
The airport's new runway is 3000 m x 45 m, flexible pavement load-rated PCN 66 F/A/W/T, designed to accommodate a Boeing 747. The terminal can accommodate 4 Boeing 747 aircraft simultaneously, albeit with a peak flow of 600 passengers per hour.

Airlines and destinations
The following airlines operate regular scheduled and charter flights at Samaná El Catey Airport:

Statistics

See also 
 List of the busiest airports in Dominican Republic
 List of the busiest airports in the Caribbean

References

Airports in the Dominican Republic
Buildings and structures in Samaná Province